Brett Reed (born May 29, 1972) is an American college basketball coach and the current head men's basketball coach for the Lehigh University Mountain Hawks. Reed is known most notably for Lehigh's upset over the Duke Blue Devils in the 2012 NCAA Division I men's basketball tournament. Lehigh was the 15 seed and knocked off the highly touted Duke program as the number 2 seed in the tournament.

Experience
Reed began his tenure at Lehigh University as an assistant coach, recruiting coordinator, academic monitor, and scout for five years from 2002 until 2007. He was promoted to head coach on August 10, 2007, succeeding Billy Taylor who had been named to a similar capacity at Ball State University two days prior on August 8. He also served as an assistant coach at High Point, UNC Greensboro and Oakland Community College. His only prior head coaching experience was at Canterbury School in Florida.

Education
Reed received a bachelor's degree in literature from Eckerd College in 1995. He earned both a master's degree in 1998 and a Ph.D. in instructional technology with a cognate in sports administration in 2003 from Wayne State University.

Head coaching record

References

External links
 Lehigh profile

1972 births
Living people
American men's basketball coaches
American men's basketball players
Basketball coaches from Michigan
Basketball players from Michigan
College men's basketball head coaches in the United States
Eckerd Tritons men's basketball players
Lehigh Mountain Hawks men's basketball coaches
People from Waterford, Michigan
Point guards
UNC Greensboro Spartans men's basketball coaches
Wayne State University alumni
Eckerd College alumni